The Sunday Times Rich List 1989 is the 1st annual survey of the wealthiest people resident in the United Kingdom, published by The Sunday Times on 2 April 1989.

In 1989 a wealth of £30 million was needed to make the top 200, (approximately £ in today's value).

The list at the time reported the Queen as the wealthiest person in the United Kingdom, with a wealth of £5.2 billion, which included state assets that were not hers personally, (approximately £ in today's value).

Top 10 fortunes

See also 

 List of billionaires (2007)

References 

Sunday Times Rich List
1989 in the United Kingdom